Jacqueline Fraysse-Cazalis (born 25 February 1947, in Paris) is a French cardiologist and politician.  A member of the French Communist Party, she served in the National Assembly of France, from 1978 to 1986, as a Senator from 1986 to 1997, and in the National Assembly again from 1997 to 2017, as a member of the French Communist Party, in the Gauche démocrate et républicaine parliamentary group.

Fraysse has also served in various capacities for the town of Nanterre, whose mayor she was from 1988 until 2004.

In her capacity as mayor, Fraysse was overseeing a meeting of the Nanterre municipal council on 26 March 2002 when Richard Durn opened fire on the group, killing eight and wounding nineteen.

References

External links
http://www.jacqueline-fraysse.fr/

1947 births
Living people
French Communist Party politicians
Women mayors of places in France
21st-century French women politicians
Women members of the National Assembly (France)
Deputies of the 12th National Assembly of the French Fifth Republic
Deputies of the 13th National Assembly of the French Fifth Republic
Deputies of the 14th National Assembly of the French Fifth Republic
Senators of Hauts-de-Seine
Politicians from Paris
20th-century French physicians
French cardiologists
Women cardiologists
20th-century French women
Women members of the Senate (France)